Fitzroy is a settlement on East Falkland. It is divided into Fitzroy North and Fitzroy South by a tidal river called Fitzroy River that is fed from a lake on the east side of Mount Whickham. The river was forded by Charles Darwin when he visited for a second time in 1834.

It is named after Robert FitzRoy, who commanded  during Darwin's voyages, and later developed a system of weather forecasting for the United Kingdom. Fitzroy is on the inlet known as Port Pleasant.

A monument on each side of a small cove at Fitzroy commemorates each ship with dedications in English and Welsh on both.

References

External links 
 

Populated places on East Falkland